The Blue Cross Centre is a large and prominent office building located in the central business district of  Moncton, New Brunswick.

The building features a three-story section facing Main Street and a nine-story tower to the south joined by an atrium. The building was constructed in 1988 and now encloses a total area of 30,200 m2 (325,000 sq ft). It includes a retail level as well as the main branch of the Moncton Public Library.

The building is currently owned and managed by Slate Office REIT. The largest tenants are the Medavie Blue Cross Insurance Company and the Atlantic Canada Opportunities Agency.

It is attached to the BMO building across Main Street via an enclosed, over-road pedestrian walkway.

2006 expansion

In 2006 The Blue Cross Centre added a new four-story building to its roster, which expanded the Blue Cross Center by 5,300 m2 (57,000 sq ft), for a total GLA of 30,200 m2. The expansion is connected to the existing building through an enclosed pedestrian walkway.

Atrium 
The building encloses the two sides with an all-glass Atrium. The atrium incorporates several large planters, a fountain, 4 indoor overhead walkways, 2 glass elevators, and several shops.

See also
 List of tallest buildings in Moncton

References

External links
Fortis Properties' information page

Buildings and structures in Moncton
Postmodern architecture in Canada
Office buildings completed in 1988